Feverhouse is a film from Ikon FCL released in 1984.

Plot summary
Feverhouse is a film in which the story is told through the preoccupations of a smug thief, a renegade nurse and a blind archivist.

Reception
Colin Greenland reviewed Feverhouse for Imagine magazine, and stated that "Is the Feverhouse a prison, a lunatic asylum, or a state of mind? Enigmatic, abstract and intense."

Time Out commented that "it hovers dangerously close to pretension, sometimes teetering over the edge, but still remains a darkly individual visual essay, despite its precedents. It's also blessed with an exciting score, a brew of metal gamelan and junkyard bebop from Biting Tongues."

References

External link
IMDb

1984 films